Gilnockie Provincial Park is a provincial park in British Columbia, Canada. This 2842-hectare park is situated southeast of Cranbrook and just north of the U.S. border. It includes the upper portion of Gilnockie Creek. Gilnockie Provincial Park protects some of the oldest fir and larch stands in the region where bears, moose, elk, white-tail and mule deer are found.

Although Gilnockie Park has low recreation values, this steep densely wooded and small wet valley encompasses wide-ranging species and habitat diversity and provides north south connectivity for many animals and birds. No facilities are provided. Visitors should be self-sufficient and proficient in backcountry travel practices.

References

Provincial parks of British Columbia
Parks in the Regional District of East Kootenay
Year of establishment missing